Bolshoye Martyn is a rural locality (a selo) in Kriushanskoye Rural Settlement, Paninsky District, Voronezh Oblast, Russia. The population was 854 as of 2010. There are 12 streets.

Geography 
Bolshoye Martyn is located on the Martyn River, 36 km south of Panino (the district's administrative centre) by road. Maly Martyn is the nearest rural locality.

References 

Rural localities in Paninsky District